Negur (also Romanized as Negūr, Nigor, Nīgvār, and Nī Kor) is a city in and capital of Dashtiari County in Sistan and Baluchestan Province, Iran. At the 2006 census, its population was 3,759, in 647 families.

Etymology
Negur is a Baluchi word meaning "foothill" and is the name of many other locations in the Pakistani and Iranian parts of Baluchistan.

Population
The original inhabitants of Negur were from the Baluchi tribe of Shaikhzadah, who according to inscriptions on gravestones lived there before the invasion of the Mongolians.  The existence of considerable underground water resources seems to have been the main reason for settling in Negur.

In 1969, after Negur became an independent municipality, many people including government staff migrated to the town from other parts of the country.  In recent years severe drought accelerated the immigration of people from other parts of Dashtyari district, posing a serious threat to water resources. Today's population of Negur is about 8,000,  mainly immigrants.

References

External links

http://wikimapia.org/4005888/negur,Wikimapia satellite image from negur

Populated places in Dashtiari County
Cities in Sistan and Baluchestan Province